Grevillea alpivaga, also known as buffalo grevillea, is a species of flowering plant in the family Proteaceae and is endemic to a restricted area of Victoria, Australia. It is a shrub with crowded, linear leaves and pale green creamy-white flowers.

Description

Taxonomy
Grevillea alpivaga was first formally described by French botanist Michel Gandoger in the Bulletin de la Société Botanique de France in 1919, from plant material collected from the Victorian Alps by Carl Walter.

Distribution and habitat
Buffalo grevillea occurs in Eucalyptus woodland on granite and sandy soil on Mount Buffalo and towards Porepunkah.

Conservation status
This grevillea is listed as "rare in Victoria" on the Department of Sustainability and Environment's Advisory List of Rare Or Threatened Plants In Victoria.

References

alpivaga
Flora of Victoria (Australia)
Proteales of Australia
Plants described in 1919
Taxa named by Michel Gandoger